The WhatsOnStage Awards, founded in 2001 as the Theatregoers' Choice Awards, are a fan-driven set of awards organised by the theatre website WhatsOnStage.com, based on a popular vote recognising performers and productions of English theatre, with an emphasis on London's West End theatre. 

The 2023 WhatsOnStage Awards, the 23rd iteration of the ceremony, is scheduled to take place on Sunday 12 February 2023 at the Prince of Wales Theatre. The ceremony is to feature several category changes from the 2022 WhatsOnStage Awards, retiring the eight acting awards (Best Actor in a Musical, Best Actress in a Musical, Best Actor in a Play and Best Actress in a Play, Best Supporting Actor in a Musical, Best Supporting Actress in a Musical, Best Supporting Actor in a Play and Best Supporting Actress in a Play) in favour of four gender-neutral categories. In addition, the Best Takeover Performance award was reinstated, having last been presented at the 2015 ceremony, and two new categories: Best Professional Debut Performance and Best Concert Event, were introduced. The ceremony will be hosted for the first time by Legally Blonde stars Courtney Bowman and Billy Luke Nevers and Spring Awakening star Laurie Kynaston.

The stage adaptation of Hayao Miyazaki's acclaimed film My Neighbour Totoro received the most nominations with nine, while the revival of Rodgers and Hammerstein's Oklahoma! was the most nominated musical, with eight. Due to the continued large volume of eligible productions, the number of nominees in each category remained at six, following an increase at the previous ceremony.

For plays, My Neighbor Totoro was the night's big winner, receiving five awards, while Oklahoma and Legally Blonde won two awards each, becoming the joint most successful musicals at the ceremony. Prima Facie was notable for winning all three of the categories in which it was nominated and was the only other show to receive multiple wins.

Winners and nominees
The nominees for the 22nd WhatsOnStage Awards were announced on 8 December 2022 by As You Like It stars Leah Harvey and Alfred Enoch in a livestream from the green room @sohoplace.

Productions with multiple wins and nominations

Multiple wins 
5 wins: My Neighbour Totoro
3 wins: Prima Facie
2 wins: Legally Blonde, Oklahoma!

Multiple nominations 
9 nominations: My Neighbour Totoro
8 nominations: Oklahoma!
6 nominations: Good, Spring Awakening
5 nominations: Tammy Faye
4 nominations: Bonnie & Clyde, Cock, Crazy for You, Legally Blonde, My Fair Lady, The Crucible, The Great British Bake Off Musical
3 nominations: Billy Elliot, Grease, Hedwig and the Angry Inch, Identical, Prima Facie, The Band's Visit, The Caucasian Chalk Circle, To Kill a Mockingbird
2 nominations: Back to the Future, Best of Enemies, Hamilton, Into the Woods, Six, The Book of Dust: La Belle Sauvage, The Book Thief, The Cher Show, The Osmonds, The Seagull, Wicked

References

British theatre awards